Dayanand Anglo Vedic Public School, Airoli is a private school in Airoli, Navi Mumbai, Maharashtra, India. Located in Sector 10 Airoli.

History
After the demise of Maharishi Swami Dayanand Saraswati in 1883, a group of socially oriented people decided to form the Dayanand Anglo - Vedic (D.A.V) College trust and Education society as a befitting tribute to his great ideas, which got registered in 1885. The society established its first institution D.A.V School, at Lahore on 1 June 1886, with Lala Hansraj (later Mahatma Hansraj) as its honorary headmaster.

DAV Public School, Airoli was Founded in year 1998 and has the strength of more than 4600 students on to rolls.

Curriculum
English is the primary language of instruction, with students also receiving compulsory education in Hindi and either Sanskrit or a regional language. The other subjects taught to the students include Physics, Chemistry, Biology, Mathematics, Geography, History, Political Science, Economics, Mass Media Studies and many more. The school is affiliated to the CBSE, New Delhi and follows the curriculum developed by the DAVCMC, Delhi till Class 8. The school students appear mainly for five main public examinations every year, namely:
All India Secondary School Examination [for Class 10 students]
All India Senior School Certificate Examination [for Class 12 students]
All India Pre-Medical/ Dental Test [for Medical/Dental aspirants]
Joint Entrance Examination (Main) [for Engineering aspirants]
Joint Entrance Examination (Advanced) [for IIT aspirants].

Location
The school is affiliated with CBSE in Airoli, Navi Mumbai managed by D A V College Managing Committee

Extracurricular activities
A team of DAV Airoli School students were awarded first place in the 10-12 Large Group category in the 2008 NASA Space Settlement Contest.

See also
 List of schools in Mumbai

References

External links

Education in Navi Mumbai
Educational institutions established in 1997
Schools in Maharashtra
Schools affiliated with the Arya Samaj
Private schools in Mumbai
1997 establishments in Maharashtra